Shelly Bradley (born Shelly Danks on November 17, 1970 in Dalhousie, New Brunswick) is a Canadian curler from Stratford, Prince Edward Island. She currently skips a team on the World Curling Tour, curling out of the Charlottetown Curling Complex in Charlottetown.

Bradley has represented Prince Edward Island at the Scotties 10 times to date. Her first appearance was at the 1994 Scott Tournament of Hearts, where she skipped her team to a 7-4 round robin finish, which was enough to qualify for a tiebreaker. She would lose the tiebreaker to Newfoundland's Laura Phillips.  Bradley was an Alternate for Kathy O'Rourke at the 2010 Scotties Tournament of Hearts, where the team lost the final to Jennifer Jones. At the 2011 Scotties Tournament of Hearts in Charlottetown her team failed to reach the playoffs finishing  6–5 in round robin play. 
 
Bradley is married and has two children.

References

External links
 

1970 births
Canadian women curlers
Living people
Curlers from New Brunswick
Curlers from Prince Edward Island
People from Queens County, Prince Edward Island
People from Restigouche County, New Brunswick
Sportspeople from Charlottetown
21st-century Canadian women